Adult chat may refer to:

 Phone sex, sexually explicit phone conversations
 Adult chat (television) channels and programs
 Adult video chat with webcam models

See also
 Cybersex
 Chat room